The Fox Chase Line is a SEPTA Regional Rail service connecting Center City Philadelphia with Fox Chase. It uses the Fox Chase Branch, which branches off from the SEPTA Main Line at Newtown Junction north of the Wayne Junction station. It runs entirely within the city of Philadelphia. The line is fully grade-separated, except for one grade crossing on Oxford Avenue. 

Originally known as the Fox Chase/Newtown Branch, service was truncated in January 1983 from Newtown to its current terminus in Philadelphia at Fox Chase. Plans to restore service beyond Fox Chase remained on SEPTA's Capital Program until 2009. The rail bed between Fox Chase and Southampton is currently utilized for interim rail trail usage. It is not officially abandoned.

History

Most of what is now the Fox Chase Branch was built by the Philadelphia, Newtown and New York Railroad between 1876 and 1878. Initially, it was part of the Pennsylvania Railroad system, but the Philadelphia and Reading Railroad leased it in 1879. Under the Reading it was known as the Newtown Branch. Following the Reading's final bankruptcy in 1976 the branch was conveyed to SEPTA; Conrail operated services under contract until 1983 when SEPTA took full control.

Accidents 
During the Reading Company era, an accident on the line in Bryn Athyn occurred where two steam trains collided head on with each other.  Almost a century later, a similar incident occurred involving a car, tank truck, and train.

Conrail/SEPTA Era 

Between 1984 and 2010 the route was designated R8 Fox Chase as part of SEPTA's diametrical reorganization of its lines. Fox Chase trains operated through the city center to the Chestnut Hill West Line. Plans had called for the Fox Chase Line to be paired with a Bryn Mawr local and designated R4, but this depended on a never-built connection from the Chestnut Hill West Line to the ex-Reading near Wayne Junction. , most Fox Chase Line trains continue through Center City to the Airport Line on weekdays and the Media/Wawa Line on weekends.

Beyond Fox Chase

Under the Reading Company Budd Rail Diesel Cars (RDCs) operated through from the Reading Terminal in downtown Philadelphia to Newtown. The Reading extended electrification to Fox Chase in 1966; limited diesel shuttles from Fox Chase to Newtown continued. SEPTA suspended these shuttles on July 1, 1981, as part of a systemwide discontinuation of non-electrified service. The shuttles returned on October 5 as the Fox Chase Rapid Transit Line. The operation of the line was troubled: the RDCs were in poor mechanical condition, SEPTA's decision to use transit division employees from the Broad Street Subway caused labor issues, and ridership was low. SEPTA suspended service again on January 18, 1983.

Since 1983, there has been interest from Bucks County passengers in resuming service to Newtown. In anticipation of a possible resumption, SEPTA performed extensive track upgrades in 1984. Street crossings in Newtown and Southampton received brand new welded rail, which were secured using sturdy Pandrol clips vs. traditional rail spikes. Though not promoted, this work was done in order to comply with a federal grant.

By March 1985, SEPTA gave into political pressure and made a concerted effort to integrate the non-electrified Fox Chase-Newtown line into the rest of its all-electrified commuter system. A $10 million plan to restore service to Newtown and Pottstown using British Rail-Leyland diesel railbuses was considered, with a test run reaching Newtown on September 3. Though the trial runs were relatively successful, ride quality was lackluster. Burdened with ongoing budgetary problems, SEPTA decided against the purchase of the railbuses.

In March 1987, SEPTA received several bids from private operators interested in running diesel-hauled trains to Newtown (as well as between Norristown and Pottstown). The operators suggested using non-union workers, which SEPTA was against. In addition, funding for these operations was allegedly questionable, and the SEPTA board rejected all offers.

Beginning in 2009, portions on the line within Montgomery County have been converted into a rail trail. By 2015, the Pennypack Trail extended  along the former line between Rockledge and Byberry Road near Bryn Athyn. Additional trackage was in Southampton was dismantled in October 2018, though several townships along the line are still hoping for resumption of rail service to alleviate traffic congestion on local roads and highways. The right-of-way in Bucks County is currently being redeveloped as the Newtown Rail Trail.

Stations
Fox Chase trains make the following station stops after leaving the Center City Commuter Connection. Stations indicated in gray background are closed. Although SEPTA suspended service to all stations north of Fox Chase in 1983 and has since converted most of the northern portion of the line to a rail trail, it continues to list those stations in its public tariff.

Ridership 
Yearly ridership on the Fox Chase Line between FY 2008–FY 2018 has remained steady around 1.2-1.4 million:

Notes

Footnotes

References

External links

Reading Company Routes and Mileages
Newtown Branch restoration website 

SEPTA Regional Rail